The caviar bowl is a piece of tableware used for serving caviar. Caviar is a highly perishable food and is therefore frequently served on ice, especially if offered before dinner or in a buffet arrangement. The typical caviar bowl is therefore made of two parts, with the outer one, to be used for ice, made of fine materials (silver plate, nickel-plated brass) in a fancy and decorative shape. The outer bowl can be used on its own for other dishes. Occasionally, the outer bowl is made of wood.

The smaller vessel, for the caviar, is made of glass or crystal and inserted into the outer one, frequently has a lid. Its size is small, suitable typically for up to six servings (standard serving size is 50 grams, about 2 ounces), usually the inner container is designed for just 1-4 servings. If the caviar is passed around during the dinner, the outer bowl with ice is not necessary.

See also 
 Caviar spoon

References

Sources
 
 
 
 
 

Serving vessels
Roe